Magda Alfredo Cazanga (born 28 May 1991) is an Angolan handball player for Club Balonmano Salud and the Angolan national team.

She competed for the Angolan team at the 2012 Summer Olympics in London and at the 2016 Summer Olympics in Rio de Janeiro.

Achievements 
Carpathian Trophy:
Winner: 2019

References

External links

Angolan female handball players
1991 births
Living people
Handball players at the 2012 Summer Olympics
Handball players at the 2016 Summer Olympics
Olympic handball players of Angola
Handball players from Luanda
Competitors at the 2019 African Games
Expatriate handball players
Angolan expatriate sportspeople in Spain
African Games competitors for Angola
Handball players at the 2020 Summer Olympics
African Games medalists in handball
African Games gold medalists for Angola